CJCK-FM is a First Nations community radio station that broadcasts at 89.9 FM in Kawawachikamach, Quebec, Canada.

Owned by Naskapi Northern Wind Radio, the station has been on the air since the early 1980s.

External links
www.naskapi.ca/
Radio-Locator info on CJCK

Naskapi
Jck
Jck
Year of establishment missing